Cafnan is a hamlet in the community of Mechell, Ynys Môn, Wales, which is 144.3 miles (232.2 km) from Cardiff and 225.8 miles (363.4 km) from London. Cafnan is represented in the Senedd by Rhun ap Iorwerth (Plaid Cymru) and is part of the Ynys Môn constituency in the House of Commons.

References

See also 
 List of localities in Wales by population

Villages in Anglesey